Euptera choveti is a butterfly in the family Nymphalidae. It is found in Cameroon, Gabon, the Republic of the Congo, the Central African Republic and the Democratic Republic of the Congo.

References

Euptera
Butterflies of Africa
Taxa named by Jean-Louis Amiet
Butterflies described in 1998